The 2009-10 FFHG Division 1 season was contested by 14 teams, and saw the Drakkars de Caen win the championship. They were promoted to the Ligue Magnus as result. The Chevaliers du Lac d’Annecy and the Galaxians d’Amnéville were relegated to FFHG Division 2.

Regular season

Playoffs

External links
Season on hockeyarchives.info

FFHG Division 1 seasons
2
Fra